Several ships have been named Albuera, originally for the Battle of Albuera (1811):

 was launched at Sunderland. She was wrecked in November 1827.
 was launched at Aberdeen. A privateer captured her in 1828, but she returned to her owners. She was wrecked in October 1829.
 was launched at Moulmain (British Burma), in 1854. She was last listed in 1881. 
She was wrecked in 1888.

See also

Citations and references
Citations

References

Ship names